Anarchism in America may refer to:

Anarchism in America (film), a 1983 film
Anarchism in the United States